Lopvador is a rural locality (a village) in Beloyevskoye Rural Settlement, Kudymkarsky District, Perm Krai, Russia. The population was 11 as of 2010.

Geography 
Lopvador is located 29 km northwest of Kudymkar (the district's administrative centre) by road. Paleva is the nearest rural locality.

References 

Rural localities in Kudymkarsky District